SP1 and variants may refer to:

 Bowlus SP-1 Paper Wing, glider
 SP-1 switch, a late 1960s telecommunications switch by Northern Electric
 Sp1 transcription factor, a human protein
 Dallara SP1, a race car
 Savoia-Pomilio SP.1, a reconnaissance and bomber aircraft built in Italy during the First World War
 USS Arawan II (SP-1), a motor yacht that served in the United States Navy as a patrol vessel from 1917 to 1918
 Vektor SP1/SP2, a pistol
 SP-01, a variant of the CZ 75 pistol
 Shapley 1, an annular planetary nebula in the constellation of Norma
 Service pack 1, a collection of computer program patches and alterations
 Surface Pro, a laplet by Microsoft
 Skulduggery Pleasant (novel), a young adult fiction novel by Derek Landy
 a model of steam toy made by British manufacturer Mamod
 a sink in the Sima Pumacocha, a cave in Peru